The 2021 Oceania Weightlifting Championships were contested from 24 to 26 September 2021.

The enduring impact of COVID-19 (which required cancellation of the 2020 championships, otherwise set to be held in Nauru) led to the competition being held in various venues across Oceania with competitors and officials linked by video, as opposed to a single competition venue. It was the first time results in a virtual competition were officially endorsed by the International Weightlifting Federation.

Medal table
In contrast to previous championships, no junior or youth rank medals were awarded.

Medal summary

Men

Women

References

External links
Results book

Weightlifting competitions
Oceania Weightlifting Championships
Oceania Weightlifting Championships
Oceania Weightlifting Championships